Sophie Van Den Akker (born 1 August 1990) is an Australian fashion model. She became the last eliminated in the sixth cycle of the reality television show Australia's Next Top Model.

Career

Australia's Next Top Model 
Sophie entered the Top Model House along with 15 other girls. As the show progressed, she evolved from a commercial to a high fashion look, particularly the 'fur shoot' where she received best picture.

She was told by Doll Wright from Elite Model Management that she could work overseas. Until the last episode before the live finale, Kelsey and Sophie were on the bottom two and the judges could not decide who would join Amanda. Therefore, they decided to bring both girls until the end. Sophie became the last eliminated on the live finale.

Model 

Sophie signed with Priscilla's Model Management in Sydney, Australia, but later moved with Chadwick Models in Melbourne & Sydney, Australia . She modeled for Avon and joined with Rachel Finch for the Speedo 2011 summer campaign.

Sophie appeared in an editorial for Faint Magazine Story UK, as well as a cover and editorial spread for Covet Magazine.

In March 2011, she walked at L'oreal Melbourne Fashion Festival 2011 and in July that year she was announced as the face of Melbourne Spring Fashion Week.

References

External links
 Melbourne Racing Club has Relaxed Members Raceday Dress Codes to Entice Young Punters

1990 births
Living people
Australian people of Dutch descent
Australian female models
Top Model finalists
Models from Melbourne